Party boy is slang for a male prostitute.

Party boy or party boys may also refer to:

Party Boy, an alias of American stunt performer Chris Pontius
The Party Boys, an Australian rock supergroup
The Party Boys (album), the group's sole album
The Party Boyz, an American hip hop group
"Partyboy", a song by Danish pop group Hej Matematik from the 2013 EP Hej lights 2012
Partyboys, a British pop trio who released a cover of "Build Me Up Buttercup" in 2003